The 1926 Central Michigan Dragons football team represented Central Michigan Normal School, later renamed Central Michigan University, as an independent during the 1926 college football season. In their fourth non-consecutive season under head coach Wallace Parker, Central Michigan compiled a 3–4–1 record (1–1 against MCC opponents) opponents and were outscored by their opponents by a combined total of 90 to 66. The team lost to its in-state rival Michigan State Normal (0–41) and defeated Detroit City College (9-0).

Wallace Parker was hired as the team's head football coach in June 1925, following the resignation of Lester Barnard. A graduate of the Springfield YMCA Training School, Parker had been the football coach at Central Michigan from 1921 to 1923, but he left in 1924 to coach at North Carolina A&M.

Schedule

References

Central Michigan
Central Michigan Chippewas football seasons
Central Michigan Dragons football